Psychotria is a genus of flowering plants in the family Rubiaceae. It contains 1,582 species and is therefore one of the largest genera of flowering plants. The genus has a pantropical distribution and members of the genus are small understorey trees in tropical forests. Some species are endangered or facing extinction due to deforestation, especially species of central Africa and the Pacific.

Many species, including Psychotria viridis, produce the psychedelic chemical dimethyltryptamine (DMT).

Selected species

 Psychotria abdita
 Psychotria acutiflora
 Psychotria adamsonii
 Psychotria alsophila
 Psychotria angustata
 Psychotria atricaulis
 Psychotria beddomei
 Psychotria bimbiensis
 Psychotria bryonicola
 Psychotria camerunensis
 Psychotria capensis
 Psychotria carronis
 Psychotria carthagenensis
 Psychotria cathetoneura
 Psychotria cernua'
 Psychotria chalconeura Psychotria chimboracensis Psychotria clarendonensis Psychotria clusioides Psychotria colorata Psychotria congesta Psychotria cookei Psychotria crassipetala Psychotria cuneifolia Psychotria cyathicalyx Psychotria dallachiana Psychotria dasyophthalma Psychotria densinervia Psychotria deverdiana Psychotria dolichantha Psychotria domatiata Psychotria dubia Psychotria dura Psychotria elachistantha Psychotria expansa Psychotria fernandopoensis Psychotria foetens Psychotria forsteriana Psychotria franchetiana Psychotria fusiformis Psychotria gardneri Psychotria glandulifera Psychotria globicephala Psychotria grandiflora Psychotria grantii Psychotria greenwelliae Psychotria guerkeana Psychotria hanoverensis Psychotria hierniana Psychotria hobdyi Psychotria insularum Psychotria lanceifolia Psychotria ligustrifolia Psychotria longipetiolata Psychotria loniceroides Psychotria macrocarpa Psychotria marchionica Psychotria mariana Psychotria mariniana Psychotria megalopus Psychotria megistantha Psychotria minimicalyx Psychotria moseskemei Psychotria nervosa Psychotria peteri Psychotria petitii Psychotria plicata Psychotria plurivenia Psychotria podocarpa Psychotria pseudoplatyphylla Psychotria punctata Psychotria raivavaensis Psychotria rhonhofiae Psychotria rimbachii Psychotria rostrata Psychotria rufipilis Psychotria saloiana Psychotria siphonophora Psychotria sodiroi Psychotria sordida Psychotria speciosa Psychotria srilankensis Psychotria tahitensis Psychotria taitensis Psychotria tenuifolia Psychotria trichocalyx Psychotria tubuaiensis Psychotria viridis Psychotria waasii Psychotria woytkowskii Psychotria zombamontana Formerly placed here 
 Psychotria elata = Palicourea elata Psychotria poeppigiana = Palicourea tomentosa''

Image gallery

See also
List of the largest genera of flowering plants

References

Psychotria L. Plants of the World Online
Accepted species Plants of the World Online

External links
Psychotria in the World Checklist of Rubiaceae

 
Rubiaceae genera
Taxa named by Carl Linnaeus